Simon Fraser, 13th Lord Lovat and 2nd Baron Lovat (21 December 1828 – 6 September 1887) was a Scottish nobleman and soldier. He was responsible for overseeing the reconstruction of Beaufort Castle, and was the 22nd Chief of Clan Fraser of Lovat.

Early life
Lovat was the eldest of four sons and three daughters born to Thomas Alexander Fraser, 12th Lord Lovat and Hon. Charlotte Georgina, daughter of George William Jerningham, 8th Baron Stafford.

Among his siblings was Amelia Charlotte Fraser (wife of Charles Scott-Murray of Danesfield), Frances Giorgiana Fraser (wife of Sir Pyers Mostyn, 8th Baronet), Charlotte Henrietta Fraser (wife of Sir Matthew Sausse, the Chief Justice of Bombay), Alexander Edward Fraser (a Lt.-Col. in the Scots Guards who fought in the Crimean War and married Georgiana Mary Heneage, only daughter of George Fieschi Heneage of Hainton Hall) George Edward Stafford Fraser (who died unmarried), and Henry Thomas Fraser (a Colonel in the 1st Battalion Scots Guards who also died unmarried).

Career
He succeeded his father in 1875. While legally the 13th Lord Lovat he was often considered in Jacobite peerage to be the 15th Lord Lovat. He resided at Beaufort Castle, and was the 22nd Chief MacShimidh of the Clan Fraser of Lovat.

He served as a Lieutenant colonel of the 2nd Battalion Queen's Own Cameron Highlanders Militia, and Lord Lieutenant of Inverness between 1873 and 1887. From 1883 to 1887, he served as aide-de-camp to Queen Victoria.

Personal life

In 1866, Lord Lovat was married to Alice Maria Weld-Blundell, the fifth daughter of Thomas Weld-Blundell  and Teresa Maria Eleanora Vaughan. They had nine children, including:

 Simon Thomas Joseph Fraser (1867–1868), who died young.
 Mary Laura Fraser (1869–1946), who married John Scott, Viscount Encombe (1870–1900), eldest son and heir apparent of John Scott, 3rd Earl of Eldon.
 Alice Mary Charlotte Fraser (1870–1958), who married Bernard Constable-Maxwell, son of William Constable-Maxwell, 10th Lord Herries of Terregles.
 Simon Joseph Fraser, 14th Lord Lovat (1871–1933), who married Laura Lister, the second daughter of Thomas Lister, 4th Baron Ribblesdale and, his first wife, Charlotte Monkton Tennant (a daughter of Sir Charles Tennant, 1st Baronet, MP for Peebles and Selkirk)
 Etheldreada Mary Fraser (1872–1949), who married diplomat Sir Francis Oswald Lindley, son of judge Lord Lindley.
 Maj. Hugh Joseph Fraser (1874–1914), who served with the Scots Guards and was killed in the First Battle of Ypres during World War I.
 Maj. Alastair Thomas Joseph Fraser (1877–1949), who married Lady Sybil Grimston, daughter of James Grimston, 3rd Earl of Verulam.
 Margaret Mary Fraser OBE (1881–1972), who married Brig.-Gen. Archibald Stirling, son of Sir William Stirling-Maxwell, 9th Baronet.
 Muriel Mary Rose Fraser (1884–1989), who became a Catholic nun.

Lord Lovat died in September 1887, aged 58, while shooting on the moors of Inverness. He was succeeded by his son Simon. Lady Blundell survived her husband by over fifty years and died in 1938, aged 92.

Descendants
Through his daughter Mary, he was a grandfather of two, including John Scott, 4th Earl of Eldon. Through his daughter Alice, he was a grandfather of twelve, including World War I flying ace Gerald Maxwell. Through his daughter Margaret, he was a grandfather of six, including Special Air Service co-founder Sir David Stirling.

Scottish actress Rose Leslie is a descendant of Fraser.

References

External links

1828 births
1887 deaths
Clan Fraser
Lord-Lieutenants of Inverness-shire
Fraser, Simon Fraser, 5th Lord
Lords Lovat